Northwest Regional Airport Terrace-Kitimat  is located  south of Terrace, British Columbia, Canada. The airport also serves Kitimat,  to the south, and the Nass Valley. It is owned and operated by the Terrace-Kitimat Airport Society.

Airlines and destinations

Statistics

Annual traffic

History
The aerodrome was listed as "under construction - serviceable" with three runways, one of which has since been taken out of service.

In 2018 the airport's newly renovated departure terminal was completed just in time for a major uptick in traffic driven by charters for industrial developments in the area.

References

External links

Certified airports in British Columbia
Terrace, British Columbia
Royal Canadian Air Force stations
Military airbases in British Columbia
Military history of British Columbia